Sara Miller McCune (born 1941) is an American businesswoman and philanthropist. She is the co-founder and executive chair of SAGE Publishing.

Early life
McCune was born the elder of two siblings in a middle-class Jewish family in Manhattan.

She was international president of B'nai B'rith Girls at the age of 19, and has spoken of the importance of tzedakah.

Career
In 1965, McCune founded the independent academic publishing company SAGE in New York City with Macmillan Publishers executive George D. McCune as a "mentor"; the name of the company is an acronym formed from the first letters of their given names. SAGE relocated to Southern California in 1966, after the two married; George McCune left Macmillan to formally join SAGE at that time. Sara Miller McCune remained president for 18 years, shifting to board chairman in 1984; retaining the title of executive chairman. The couple continued to develop the company together until George McCune's death in 1990. In 2021 McCune signed over her voting shares and control of the company to the SAGE-SMM Trust, citing this as a strategy to ensure SAGE remains independent.

Philanthropy
McCune has funded schools in the developing world, and made contributions to  California organizations and educational establishments, including  $2.5 million to Santa Barbara Cottage Hospital, $3.5 million to found the SAGE Center For the Study of the Mind at UCSB, and over $5 million to the Granada Theater Restoration Project. She is also a Trustee and supporter of the UCSB Foundation  She founded the charitable McCune Foundation in 1990. In 2003, she received the Spirit of Entrepreneurship award at the Entrepreneur of the Year awards, sponsored by Ernst and Young.  Women’s Campaign International (WCI) recently honored her at an event entitled Shattering The Glass Ceiling: Honoring Inspirational Women Around The Globe.

In 2007, McCune founded the Miller-McCune Center for Research, Media and Public Policy  in Santa Barbara, California, and serves as its executive chairman. In 2008, she announced the launch of Miller-McCune magazine, published in print and online, by the nonprofit Miller McCune Center for Research, Media and Public Policy, with support from SAGE. On February 21, 2012 the magazine rebranded as Pacific Standard. In 2017, the magazine and the center’s mission were transferred to the newly launched Social Justice Foundation. On August 7, 2019, the editor of Pacific Standard reported that the magazine was closing, after McCune abruptly cut off funding.

In 2014, she became a member of the distinguished Visiting Committee of the Social Science Research Council, based in New York City. In 2015, she established a fund for research methods at the Council. In 2017, she joined the Council’s board of directors.

Honours
In 2016, McCune received an honorary degree from California State University Channel Islands for her support for the arts, social issues and patronage and an honorary doctorate from Sussex University.

In 2014, McCune was named as one of Folio’s 100 Visionaries. In 2016, McCune received the Rock Star: Lifetime Achievement Award from the Spirit of Entrepreneurship Foundation. In 2017, McCune was recognized and honored by the Association of Learned and Professional Society Publishers for her contribution to scholarly publishing. and in 2018, she was awarded the London Book Fair Lifetime Achievement Award in recognition of her 50+ years working within the publishing industry. She was elected to the American Philosophical Society in 2018.

References

External links
 McCune Foundation
 

Living people
People from Manhattan
American publishers (people)
Jewish American philanthropists
Members of the American Philosophical Society
Philanthropists from New York (state)
1941 births
Social Science Research Council
20th-century publishers (people)
21st-century publishers (people)
20th-century American businesswomen
20th-century American businesspeople
21st-century American businesswomen
21st-century American businesspeople
20th-century American philanthropists
21st-century philanthropists
Businesspeople from New York City
21st-century American Jews
21st-century women philanthropists
21st-century American philanthropists
20th-century women philanthropists
California State University Channel Islands people
People associated with the University of Sussex